Phizackerley is a British surname. Notable people with the surname include:

Gerald Phizackerley (born 1929), British clergy, Archdeacon of Chesterfield
John Phizackerley (born 1962), British banker

Surnames of British Isles origin